The Noorderhaaks-class Harbour Patrol Boat are used by the Royal Netherlands Navy, primarily to patrol the Nieuwe Haven Naval Base and its surroundings. They were built by Jongert and put into service on 2 June 2015.

Ships in class

References 

Patrol vessels of the Royal Netherlands Navy
Patrol ship classes